Khal Kiasar (also Romanized as Khāl Kīāsar) is a village in Chaf Rural District, in the Central District of Langarud County, Gilan Province, Iran. At the 2006 census, its population was 706, in 235 families.

References 

Populated places in Langarud County